Thompson Valley High School (TVHS) is located at 1669 Eagle Drive in Loveland, Colorado. Its mascot is the golden eagle. It is one of five high schools in the Thompson R2-J School District, along with Loveland High School, Mountain View High School, Harold Ferguson High School, and Berthoud High School.

Athletics
Thompson Valley hosts 24 varsity sports, as well as a club hockey team, and a water polo team, which have not been declared varsity sports.

Girls' swimming

In 2010 the Lady Eagles and Coach Changstrom won their first 4A state title on February 13, 2010 with 330 points.

Football
In 2015 the varsity football team was spotlighted in Michelle Lambert's music video Warrior.

Notable alumni

 Lindsey Daugherty, attorney and member of the Colorado House of Representatives
Kyle Howard, television and movie actor

References

External links
 

Public high schools in Colorado
Loveland, Colorado
Schools in Larimer County, Colorado